Theodor Johannes Adolph Gerdener (19 March 1916 – 21 November 2013) was a South African politician and author.

Born in Cape Town, Gerdener served as an interior minister for the National Party. He resigned from the National Party, and founded and chaired the Democratic Party from 1973 to 1977. He was Administrator of the Natal Province between November 1961 and August 1970.

Theo Gerdener died on 21 November 2013, aged 97, in Pretoria.

References

1916 births
2013 deaths
Politicians from Cape Town
South African writers
White South African people
National Party (South Africa) politicians
Democratic Party (South Africa, 1973) politicians
Writers from Cape Town